In Too Deep may refer to:

Film and television 
 In Too Deep (1989 film), an Australian erotic thriller film
 In Too Deep (1999 film), an American crime thriller film
 Degrassi: In Too Deep, the U.S. DVD title for the final 12 episodes of season 10 of Degrassi

Literature 
 In Too Deep (novel), a 2009 39 Clues novel by Jude Watson
 In Too Deep, a 2010 Robyn Hunter novel by Norah McClintock
 In Too Deep, a 2011 Arcane Society novel by Jayne Ann Krentz
 In Too Deep: BP and the Drilling Race that Brought it Down, a book by Alison Fitzgerald and Stanley Reed

Music

Albums 
 In Too Deep (John Paul Young album) or the title song, 2006
 In Too Deep (soundtrack) or the title song by Nas and Nature, from the 1999 film

Songs 
 "In Too Deep" (Dead or Alive song), 1985
 "In Too Deep" (Genesis song), 1986
 "In Too Deep" (Jenny Morris song), 1995; covered by Belinda Carlisle, 1996
 "In Too Deep" (Sum 41 song), 2001
 "In Too Deep" (Tijana Bogićević song), representing Serbia at Eurovision 2017
 "In Too Deep", by Derek St. Holmes, 2000
 "In Too Deep", by Eminem from Music to Be Murdered By, 2020
 "In Too Deep", by Lost Frequencies from Less Is More, 2016
 "In Too Deep", by the Sweeplings, 2016
 "In Too Deep", by Why Don't We from 8 Letters, 2018

See also
 "N 2 Deep", a 2021 song by Drake
 In Deep (disambiguation)
 In the Deep (disambiguation)